Adam Dariusz Seroczyński (born March 13, 1974) is a Polish sprint canoeist who competed from 1997 to 2008. Competing in three Summer Olympics, he won a bronze medal in the K-4 1000 m event at Sydney in 2000. For his sport achievements, he received the Golden Cross of Merit in 2000.

Seroczyński also won three medals at the ICF Canoe Sprint World Championships with a silver (K-2 1000 m: 2007) and two bronzes (K-1 1000 m: 2002, K-2 1000 m: 2006).

He is now a member of the Posnania Poznań club. In September 2008, following the Beijing Olympics, Seroczyński tested positive for clenbuterol in a doping test. He was officially suspended for two years by the International Canoe Federation for his actions during the 2008 Summer Olympics and became the first canoeist to fail a doping test during the Summer Olympics.

References

External links 
 
 
 

1974 births
Canoeists at the 2000 Summer Olympics
Canoeists at the 2004 Summer Olympics
Canoeists at the 2008 Summer Olympics
Doping cases in canoeing
Living people
Olympic canoeists of Poland
Olympic bronze medalists for Poland
Sportspeople from Olsztyn
Polish male canoeists
Polish sportspeople in doping cases
Olympic medalists in canoeing
ICF Canoe Sprint World Championships medalists in kayak
Medalists at the 2000 Summer Olympics
World Rowing Championships medalists for Poland